Woodsetts, is a civil parish in the Metropolitan Borough of Rotherham, South Yorkshire, England.  The parish contains three listed buildings that are recorded in the National Heritage List for England.  All the listed buildings are designated at Grade II, the lowest of the three grades, which is applied to "buildings of national importance and special interest".  The parish contains the village of Woodsetts and the surrounding area, and the listed buildings consist of two houses and a farmhouse.


Buildings

References

Citations

Sources

 

Lists of listed buildings in South Yorkshire
Buildings and structures in the Metropolitan Borough of Rotherham